Spider-Man: Reign is a four-issue comic book limited series featuring Spider-Man, written and illustrated by Kaare Andrews and published by Marvel Comics. Set 30 years into Spider-Man's future, on Earth-70237, it features a retired Spider-Man who returns to combat the injustices of a vastly different New York City.

Publication history
On December 12, 2006, Marvel announced that issue #1 had sold out through Diamond Comic Distributors and that a second printing would be released.

The series has been compared to The Dark Knight Returns, a comparison which Marvel has also quoted when promoting Reign. As well as the thematic similarities between the two stories, both of which revisit aged heroes after the end of their careers, The Dark Knight Returns is also acknowledged within the pages of Reign by the inclusion of a character named Miller Janson (the name reflects Dark Knight Returns creators Frank Miller and Klaus Janson).

The book also has several themes relevant in the post 9/11 world, most notably Mayor Waters taking control of the city of New York to protect it, and the WEBB, an energy field that seals all of New York inside it so no one can leave.

Plot
Thirty years into Spider-Man's future, New York City has become a safe, albeit authoritarian territory under the complete control of Mayor Waters. Superheroes and supervillains are no longer prevalent, instead replaced by the authoritarian government's police force, "The Reign".

An elderly Peter Parker works as a florist, but he is fired for ruining a couple's wedding by sending the wrong flowers. He bumps into a child fleeing from the Reign, and as they show up to arrest the youth, Peter is also beaten alongside him.

Parker returns home and is haunted by memories of his deceased wife Mary Jane, as Mayor Waters announces the WEBB system to protect the city from attacks. Behind the scenes, he keeps a vegetative Kingpin prisoner, mocking him.

At Peter's apartment, J. Jonah Jameson delivers him a package. Jameson also apologizes for his years of abuse, explaining he sold the Daily Bugle because he realized he was running it on lies. Jameson leaves and starts a riot, which leads to a fight against two Reign officers. Meanwhile, Parker opens the package revealing a camera and his old black-suit mask. He defeats the officers wearing only the mask and his underwear, imagining himself in his prime. After Jameson asks if Spider-Man is back,  Peter punches him and walks away silently.

Mayor Waters is dismayed at the return of Spider-Man and releases Electro, Mysterio, Kraven the Hunter, the Sandman, the Scorpion and Hydro-Man from prison. The Mayor then tells the newly christened "Sinner Six" that, if they defeat their old nemesis, they can leave New York. Jameson announces the return of Spider-Man as the Reign cracks down on the citizens. Following the news of Spider-Man's return, an elderly Hypno-Hustler comes out of retirement in hopes of aiding his former foe. Unfortunately, the boombox he uses to hypnotize the police soon runs out of battery power, allowing the Reign to shoot and kill him.

Peter's apartment is shot at and destroyed with a missile as he struggles with his hallucinations of Mary Jane, who acts as a guide for his actions in the present day. After the smoke clears, Spider-Man leaps out cheerfully, wearing his full black costume and using his old tactics of taunting his foes.

Spider-Man is cornered by the Sinner Six, and Kraven rips his mask off, disheartening the crowd when they realize their hero is an old, defeated man. His life is saved at the last moment by a deceased Doctor Octopus, whose final command to his tentacles cause them to show Peter three grave-markers: those of Mary Jane Watson-Parker, May Parker, and Ben Parker.

After being buried in Mary Jane's coffin by Octopus's tentacles and coming face-to-face with and conquering his inner demons, Peter emerges in his famous red-and-blue suit, which he had secretly buried with her.

In the Mayor's office, a detained Jameson attacks him, only to realize that Edward Saks, the mayor's assistant, is actually Venom. Venom uses the WEBB system to project his suit, converting the population of New York into an army of symbiotes that does his bidding. He calls the Sinner Six back to guard the building as Spider-Man begins his assault.

The unconverted population use bells to drive the symbiote invasion back and the Sandman defects when the Reign attacks his daughter, whom he had never met before.

Spider-Man defeats the remaining members of the Sinner Six and battles Venom. The Sandman arrives at the last minute and gives Spider-Man a detonator, telling him that the six of them were implanted with explosives that would be triggered if they ever disobeyed Waters' orders. Spider-Man activates the detonator, causing the Six to explode and killing Venom in the process.

After Venom and the Reign are defeated, Jameson reports that all crime levels are back to where they were years ago, but so are the superheroes. As Peter visits Mary Jane's grave, he states that he will join her in peace one day, but until then, he has "responsibilities" to attend to.

Characters
 Peter Parker/Spider-Man: Now a lonely senior citizen, Peter Parker lives alone in a small apartment and suffers hallucinations of Mary Jane. With the reappearance of J. Jonah Jameson, he faces his past life as Spider-Man and gradually faces his isolation and fears to re-accept his responsibility to those he has sworn to protect. An alternative version of this character was later killed by Daemos in Spider-Verse using his wife's tombstone as a weapon. Due to his lack of a costume and chronology, this was revealed to be an alternate version of the character.
 Mayor Waters: New York's current mayor. Waters backs a "laser-powered protective barrier", the WEBB, which will supposedly protect the city from any "super-terrorist attack". He has also suspended the normal electoral processes, remaining in office without an election and justifying this as a security issue. His office is known as the Reign.
 J. Jonah Jameson: A seemingly senile old man, often compared to Citizen Kane, he returns "from the mountain" to spread a message of impending disaster. He comes to suspect the Mayor is colluding with the Venom symbiote and laces his rants with metaphorical allusions to the threat. He raises a small army of children to help him in bringing Spider-Man out of retirement to save the city again.
 Mary Jane Watson-Parker: The long-dead wife of Peter Parker. Though dead, she appears as a recurring hallucination to Peter. It is revealed that she died of cancer brought on by exposure to Peter's radioactive semen during intercourse over the years.
 The Sinner Six:  A version of the Sinister Six, composed of supervillains now in their senior years. Dubbed the "Sinner Six", this version of the team is forced into the employ of New York's fascist mayor, Mayor Waters. If the team manages to kill Spider-Man, they will gain their freedom from New York, which is sealed within the WEBB security system. The team consists of the Scorpion, Electro, Mysterio, Kraven the Hunter, Hydro-Man, and the Sandman. Spider-Man faces each as he attempts to reach the top of Olympus Tower.
 The Hypno-Hustler: An aged supervillain, now sympathizing with Spider-Man. Realizing that Spider-Man is coming out of retirement and the Reign will be challenged, he attempts to help by using his old hypno-music to distract Reign officers and encourage citizens to revolt. Unfortunately, his boombox loses power and the officers swiftly retaliate with deadly force, killing him immediately.
 Otto Octavius: Doctor Octopus has died years prior to the start of the story. The four arms remain connected to the skeletal remains of Otto Octavius. Still powered, they act on artificial intelligence to carry out his final wish – to find Peter Parker and return him to his costume in an effort to encourage him to retake the mantle of Spider-Man.
 Edward Saks/Venom (Eddie Brock): Waters' assistant, Venom is the mastermind behind the WEBB system, allowing him to summon a symbiotic army. He replicated his symbiote a hundred times and strives to have his final revenge on Spider-Man for abandoning him years ago. He mentions a person named Eddie, mostly likely Eddie Brock. It is unknown whether he and Brock are one and the same.
 The Kingpin: Kept alive via an IV drip, the former Kingpin of Crime is reduced to being a prisoner visited every year by Waters upon the anniversary of the latter's takeover of the city.
 Susie Baker: A pre-teen girl who is William Baker's daughter. She is fashioned as a tomboy in slacks and a jacket over a striped shirt. She is a recurring character and is witness to several events in the story, which builds her courage to lead a group of children in revolt against the symbiote attack. She reveals herself to be the daughter of the Sandman, with the ability to turn herself into cement, and dies in defiance of Reign officers.

Reception
Spider-Man: Reign has been received moderately positive by critics. In 2011, Complex ranked Spider-Man: Reign 17 on a list of the 25 top Spider-Man stories of all time, adding that while it might not be the best original Spider-Man story ever (having been inspired by Frank Miller's The Dark Knight Returns), it is still one of the best, due to being simultaneously heartbreaking and uplifting. Chad Nevett mixedly reviewed the series for CBR.com and noted the series' subject matter to have been inspired by both the plot of The Dark Knight Returns and the lighter, more comedic tone of its sequel The Dark Knight Strikes Again, praising Venom's use in the story, Peter Parker's complexity and maturity and Kaare Andrews' Miller-inspired art style, stating that Spider-Man: Reign may be a horribly-flawed work, but compelling in its own way. io9 ranked the series' version of an older and widowed Peter Parker 15 on a list of the greatest Spider-Men of all time in 2017, citing that Andrews' story is the most perfect example of how miserable Parker's life is in most Spider-Man interpretations. 

However, the series' response has not been all extremely positive. In a more negative review, Thomas Andrew from liveaboutdotcom ranked Spider-Man: Reign fourth on a list of the five most controversial Spider-Man stories, criticizing it for its lack of originality, fierceness and invention. Another criticized aspect was the revelation that Mary Jane's untimely death was given to Peter's radioactivity every time that they had sexual intercourse without protection, citing it as slightly inappropriate for a superhero comic book. Back when the series was released, Wired criticized Mary Jane's odd death, accusing Marvel Comics of "having finally gone porno".

Nudity controversy
In issue #1, there is a panel known as the "Nude Panel". As the elderly Peter Parker sits on the edge of his bed (hands on his face), his genitals were exposed for the first time in the character's history. The issue was soon recalled and removed from the second run of Spider-Man: Reign #1 for fear of "corrupting minors".

In other media

Television
A version of Mayor Waters, this one a female, appears in The Spectacular Spider-Man animated series, voiced by B.J. Ward.

Collected editions
The series has been collected into a single volume:

Hardcover (collects #1–4, April 2007, 160 pages)
Paperback (collects #1–4, April 2008, 160 pages)

References

External links

Newsarama: Kaare Andrews on Spider-Man: Reign. Newsarama, August 5, 2006
Welcome Friendly Kaare Andrews To The Neighborhood With "Spider-Man: Reign", Comic Book Resources, August 11, 2006

2006 comics debuts
2007 comics endings
Spider-Man titles
Obscenity controversies in comics